The Northern California Renaissance Faire, owned by Play Faire Productions is a Renaissance faire in California located in Hollister about 90 miles southeast of San Francisco. The Renaissance Festival typically runs on weekends from mid-September to mid-October. It consists of five or six weekends depending on the year. It is set in the fictional village of "Willingtown" in Derbyshire, England during the reign of Queen Elizabeth I in the mid-late 16th Century.

Features
The faire hosts over 200 artisans and six stages of non stop shows. A cast of 1000 performers fill the streets in costumes of the era.  Gate 6 at Casa de Fruta is the entrance to the faire. The faire showcases two jousting matches every day of the faire. There is also a concert held every Saturday at 6pm as the faire closes.

Themed Weekends

Each of the five weekends of the festival take on a different theme, influencing the performances, costumes, food, drink, art, shops, contests, and games throughout the festival grounds.
Opening Weekend 
Pirate theme 
Heroes and Warriors 
Oktoberfest 
Fantasy Forever

Covid-19 
The faire was canceled in 2020 due to COVID-19. It returned in 2021.

See also 

 Renaissance fair

References

Renaissance fairs